Athletics competitions at the 2003 South Pacific Games were held at the National Stadium in Suva, Fiji, between July 7 and 12, 2003.

A total of 44 events were contested, 23 by men and 21 by women.

There were some issues with the eligibility of athletes.  Lisa Misipeka and Kelsey Nakanelua, both from American Samoa, were excluded, because due to the games charter, the athletes must have lived in their country or territory for at least five years.  Expatriates must have lived in that country or territory for a period of four years immediately prior to the closing date for individual entries. Kristy Slade from Samoa was also found to be ineligible after winning the women's heptathlon.

Medal summary
Medal winners and their results were published on the Athletics Weekly webpage
courtesy of Tony Isaacs and Børre Lilloe, and on the Oceania Athletics Association webpage by Bob Snow.

Complete results can also be found on the Oceania Athletics Association webpage by Bob Snow.
The fully automatic timing malfunctioned during the Men's 100 metres, and was totally out of action later in the programme.

Men

†: The 3000 metres steeplechase event was one lap too long (approximately 3400 metres) due to a mistake in the lap counting.

Women

winner of the hammer throw with 45.83 m.  However, she subsequently failed a drug test and had the performance deleted.
**: Initially, Kristy Slade from  won the women's heptathlon with 4.494 pts, but she was challenged and found to be ineligible to participate.
***: Initially, the  team (Vasiti Vatureba, Makelesi Bulikiobo, Miriama Radiniwaimaro, Mereoni Raluve) won the women's 4x400 metres relay running a new games record in 3:40.03.  However, they had to be disqualified for substituting a runner after the final submission of the team composition and running order.

Medal table (unofficial)
The medal table was published.

Participation (unofficial)
Athletes from the following 19 countries were reported to participate:

 
 
 
 
 
 
 
 
 
 
 
 
 
 
 
 
 
 
/

References

External links
Pacific Games Council
Oceania Athletics Association

Athletics at the Pacific Games
International athletics competitions hosted by Fiji
South Pacific Games
2003 in Fijian sport
2003 South Pacific Games